The Hollows series (also called the Rachel Morgan series) is a series of 16 urban fantasy novels, eight short stories, two graphic novels, and one compendium resource by Kim Harrison, published by HarperCollins Publishers, in an alternate history universe and set primarily in the city of Cincinnati and its suburbs. The alternate history is built upon two premises: the recent open existence of magical and supernatural species, primarily witches, vampires, and werewolves, with the human population; and the historical investment of Cold War military spending in genetic engineering as opposed to the Space Race, which resulted in the accidental release of a genetically modified tomato in the 1960s that killed a significant portion of the human population. The series is set approximately 40 years after this plague, referred to as ”The Turn“ within the series.

The series is told in the first-person point of view of Rachel Morgan, a bounty hunter witch who works with local law enforcement agencies and faces threats both mundane and supernatural in origin. The series also focuses on Rachel's relationships with her partners, a living vampire and a pixy, as well as her personal relationships with males of different species.

Reading order by publication date
 1.  Dead Witch Walking
 2.  The Good, The Bad, and The Undead
2.1  Undead in the Garden of Good and Evil (Ivy novella in the Dates From Hell anthology, also in Into the Woods compilation)
 3.  Every Which Way But Dead
 4.  A Fistful of Charms
4.1  Dirty Magic (Mia short story in the Hotter Than Hell anthology, also in Into the Woods compilation)
 5.  For A Few Demons More
5.1  The Bridges of Eden Park (Kisten/Rachel short story in For a Few Demons More(US mass market edition), also in Into the Woods compilation)
5.2  Two Ghosts For Sister Rachel (Robbie/Rachel/Pierce novella in the Holidays Are Hell anthology, also in Into the Woods compilation)
 6.  The Outlaw Demon Wails (retitled Where Demons Dare in the UK)
6.1  The Bespelled (Ceri/Al short story in The Outlaw Demon Wails (US mass market edition), also in the Demons anthology and the Into the Woods compilation)
 7.  White Witch, Black Curse
7.1  Ley Line Drifter (Bis/Jenks novella in Unbound anthology, also in Into the Woods compilation)
 8.  Black Magic Sanction
 9.  Pale Demon
9.1  Blood Work (Graphic novel of Rachel's internship under Ivy at the Inderlander Security)
9.2  The Hollows Insider (The Hollows world book - an overarching new story, character profiles, maps, spell guides, charm recipes, secret correspondence, ... )
 10. A Perfect Blood
10.1 Million-Dollar Baby (Trent novella an Into the Woods original)
10.2 Blood Crime (Graphic Novel of Rachel's continued interning under Ivy at the IS)
10.3 Trouble on Reserve (pre-installed on Sony eReader for iPhone, iPad and iPod Touch - now available here https://www.wattpad.com/story/11626262-trouble-on-reserve/parts)
 11. Ever After
 12. The Undead Pool
 13. The Witch With No Name
 13.1  Sudden Backtrack
 13.2  Waylaid (a Peri Reed and Hollows crossover)
 14. American Demon
 15. Million Dollar Demon 
 16. Trouble with the Cursed (June 14, 2022)

Chronological reading order
 0.  Novellas happening before first book
 0.1  Sudden Backtrack (How and why Newt & Algaliarept cursed the elven race thousands of years ago)
 0.2  The Bespelled (How Algaliarept took Ceri to the ever-after)
 0.3  Two Ghosts For Sister Rachel (When and how Rachel and Pierce have met)
 0.4  Undead in the Garden of Good and Evil (Ivy's rebuff of Art and when she and Rachel began to work with each other)
 0.5  Blood Work (Graphic Novel of Rachel's interning under Ivy at the Inderlander Security)
 0.6  Blood Crime (Graphic Novel of Rachel's continued interning under Ivy at the Inderlander Security)
 1.  Dead Witch Walking
 2.  The Good, The Bad, and The Undead
 3.  Every Which Way But Dead
 4.  A Fistful of Charms
 4.1  The Bridges of Eden Park (Rachel helps Kisten to save a child of his sister)
 5.  For A Few Demons More
 6.  The Outlaw Demon Wails
 6.1  Dirty Magic
 7.  White Witch, Black Curse
 7.1  Leyline Drifter (Jenks and Biz's adventure with a dryad, a nymph and a pixie family in need)
 8.  Black Magic Sanction
 9.  Pale Demon
 9.1  Million-Dollar Baby (How Jenks and Trent rescued/kidnapped Trent's daughter)
 10.  A Perfect Blood
 10.1  Trouble on Reserve
 11.  Ever After
 12.  The Undead Pool
 13.  The Witch with No Name
 14.  American Demon
 15.  Million Dollar Demon
 16.  Trouble with the Cursed

Shorts and novellas
 Undead in the Garden of Good and Evil: An allusion to Midnight in the Garden of Good and Evil (1997) which Clint Eastwood produced and directed.
 Dirty Magic: An allusion to Dirty Harry (1971).
 The Bridges of Eden Park: An allusion to The Bridges of Madison County (1995).
 Two Ghosts For Sister Rachel: An allusion to Two Mules for Sister Sara (1970).
 Ley Line Drifter: An allusion to High Plains Drifter (1973).
 Million Dollar Baby: An allusion to Million Dollar Baby (2004).
 Trouble on Reserve: An allusion to Trouble with the Curve (2012).
 Sudden Backtrack: An allusion to Sudden Impact (1983).

Graphic novels
Blood Work: An Original Hollows Graphic Novel: This shares the name of Blood Work (2002).
Blood Crime: An Original Hollows Graphic Novel: An allusion to True Crime (1999).

Characters

Main characters
Each of the main Hollows novels are written first-person from the perspective of Rachel Morgan exclusively.  However, the collection of Kim Harrison's Hollows short stories published in 2012 (between A Perfect Blood and Ever After) as Into The Woods:  Tales from the Hollows and Beyond, include one short story each from the perspectives of the other four major characters:
 Undead in the Garden of Good and Evil (Ivy)
 Ley Line Drifter (Jenks)
 Million-Dollar Baby (Trent)
 The Bespelled (Al)

In addition, the two graphic novel prequels which explore how Rachel Morgan and Ivy Tamwood first happened to work together — Blood Work, and Blood Crime,  — are both written first-person from the perspective of Ivy Tamwood.

Rachel Mariana Morgan
A 25-year-old witch-born, day-walking demon. She is an equal partner in the 'Vampiric Charms' freelance runner and security service that she founded with Ivy Tamwood (a living vampire) and Jenks (a pixy), all formerly with the vampire-run federal Inderland Security (IS) police service, although they now frequently work in collaboration with the human-run Federal Inderland Bureau (FIB) on special projects. The three live and work together in a small decommissioned stone church with attached garden and graveyard in the Hollows district outside Cincinnati. Initially practicing only simple herb-based earth magic, as the stories progress Rachel is forced to learn and master progressively more difficult ley line and even demon magic to do her job and protect the lives of her friends and family. Yet even as her power grows, Rachel never loses her moral center; she frequently risks her own safety to avoid harm to others. Rachel is the sole female survivor of the Rosewood Syndrome, a normally fatal genetic blood disorder that occurs only in witch children. Eventually, it is revealed that witches are in fact demons that have had their magical potential reduced by an ancient curse, and Rosewood Syndrome is the result of witch children being born with the full potential of demon magic. Described by Trent as "five-foot-eight inches of bothersome redhead", Rachel has green eyes and shoulder-length frizzy hair which seems to have life of its own. With a lean, athletic build, she looks good in leather, but can also dress elegantly as required for work. Rachel appreciates the finer qualities of the male form and does not discriminate based on species. Her gift is improvisation under stress. Her mother, Alice, is still living, and she has one estranged older brother (Robbie) who escaped being born with Rosewood.  Rachel's aura color is gold, like both Trent and Algaliarept.

Ivy Alisha Tamwood
A living vampire. She is an equal partner in 'Vampiric Charms' freelance runner and security service with Rachel Morgan (a witch) and Jenks (a pixy). A natural detective (compared with the more mercurial Rachel), Ivy's gift is organization and planning. Her personal mantra is restraint and control. Six feet tall, elegantly thin, and very pale, Ivy has long black hair and an Asian cast.  She struggles with her vampiric nature on a lifelong and personal level after a deeply traumatic adolescence twisted by Cincinnati's ancient undead master vampire Piscary, which has left her plagued with guilt at past violence and an inability to separate blood from sex. Ivy trusts Rachel to find some way to save her soul. She is highly protective and deeply devoted to both Rachel and Jenks, whom she credits with helping her discover how to live a 'normal' life. As a bisexual vampire, she enjoyed long-time relationships with both Piscary's scion Kisten Felps, a male fellow survivor of the same nightmare she grew up with, and Piscary's young female lawyer Skimmer. She is also attracted to Rachel. Ivy's father is still a living vampire, but her mother is 'undead'. Ivy has one younger sister, Erica, a bubbly teenager whose innocence Ivy is determined to protect.  She will kill to preserve those she loves.

Jenks
An eighteen-year-old pixy:  a four-inch-tall flying man. Jenks is an equal partner in 'Vampiric Charms' freelance runner and security service, together with Rachel Morgan (a witch) and Ivy Tamwood (a living vampire). An intel and reconnaissance specialist, Jenks is a skilled saboteur, swordsman, and electronics expert. He is gifted with an acute sense of smell and hearing. He sees auras without needing second sight. Jenks backs up both Rachel and Ivy on their runs, but can and does provide lethal force as required against what he calls 'lunkers' (big people) as well as the six-inch and fearsomely carnivorous fairies, who are the natural and mortal enemies of pixies. Jenks' dragonfly-like wings change color with his emotional state due to changes in blood flow. With a wicked sense of humor, Jenks is a blunt speaker who is unafraid to say anything to anyone. Even though he looks like a healthy college-freshman-in-miniature with his athletic form, laughing green eyes, and curly bright blond hair, Jenks is nearing the end of his natural pixy lifespan. This was a major concern to both Rachel and Ivy until Rachel gave Jenks a curse to make him human-size to help protect Rachel on a road trip during a cold month. After he was returned to his normal size, he was rejuvenated and had a new lease on life, adding another 20 years.  As the only married member of the team — Jenks and his wife Matalina are successfully raising 54 children (multiple-births being the norm with pixies. Their children's extraordinarily high survival rate is the result of what is in pixy terms a veritable "castle of oak"—Jenks and his family live in a stump within the church's lush garden). Jenks unstintingly offers brash and unsolicited—but usually accurate—relationship advice to both of his work partners (Rachel in particular, as he thinks her relationships need "particular help") as well as anyone else who will listen.  Jenks and his family move indoors into the old church sanctuary during the cold winter months to avoid hibernation, which normally results in several children dying. This allows them to provide on-site security for the whole building and grounds all year round, which also makes his family the first pixies in Cincinnati to experience snow.

Trenton Aloysius Kalamack
Billionaire businessman and politician, peculiarly mysterious for one of Cincinnati's most powerful citizens, whose global empire of legitimate businesses and public philanthropy serve as a front for drug-running and illegal genetic research activities.  Not until late in the second book (The Good, the Bad, and the Undead) does Rachel discover Trent is secretly an elf, a species thought to have become extinct during the Turn:  a 21st-century elven prince of pure blood, charged with healing the elven genome crippled during their ancient war in the Ever After with the demons.  Breeds racehorses and hunters as well as maintaining a full pack of hounds — 'The Hunt' pursues two- as well as four-legged quarry — at his vast and heavily wooded estate, which also serves as his primary residence and global corporate headquarters; public tours are available.  Trent shares a childhood history with Rachel that neither completely remembers, due to memory blockers in the water at the make-a-wish camp for dying children they both survived.  His father was responsible for curing Rachel's Rosewood Syndrome.  Orphaned as a teenager, Trent had two older siblings who failed to survive infancy.  Though less than two years older than Rachel, Trent has been raised since birth by fellow elves his chief of personnel (the six-foot-ten-inch Jonathan Davaros) and chief of security (magic and martial arts master Quen Hanson) to use 'whatever means necessary' to ensure the survival and recovery of the elven people.  Rachel and Trent have a love/hate relationship, because of his worldview that that End (preservation of his species) must justify the Means — even, if necessary, death.  A brilliant, clever, and resourceful man ... but morally ambiguous.  Trent is very attractive, tall, lean and athletically built, with baby-fine blond hair and green eyes.  He employs his personal charisma and low melodious voice as effective weapons.

Algaliarept
(Also known as "Al" or "Gally".)  An ancient demon at least 5,000 years old.  In his own words, "a dealer in flesh and seducer of souls, skilled in training people in the dark arts enough to make them marketable, then abducting them when they made a mistake in order to sell them to his peers [demons] into an extended lifetime of servitude" — a Purveyor of Fine Familiars.  Personally remembers, with great bitterness and much hatred, the elf-demon war which transformed the formerly eden-like Ever After into a red hell and trapped the demons there forever.  Survived slavery to an elf in ancient times, by killing his master.  Still hates the elves with passion, today.  Trapped an elf princess (Ceridwen Merriam Dulciate) for 1,000 years as his personal familiar and sex slave.  Clever, resourceful, conniving, yet honorable enough in his own peculiar twisted way.  Like all the surviving demons, has shape-shifted through spells for so many thousand years that he no longer remembers his original form.  Takes particular pleasure in adopting whichever persona his current target fears most — whether male, female, or not even humanoid — pulled from that target's deepest subconscious.  But his own personally preferred persona of self-representation is a ruddy skinned 18th-Century British nobleman, tall and powerfully built, with green crushed velvet tailcoat and white gloves.  The one aspect he finds difficult to hide are his horizontally goat-slitted red demon eyes, so he frequently wears round blue-tinted glasses to disguise them.  Had been married in ancient times, to a demoness named Celffnah.

Background
The series is set in an alternate history where supernatural beings live side-by-side with normal humans.  According to this timeline, after the discovery of the DNA double-helix by James D. Watson, Francis Crick and Rosalind Franklin, genetic manipulation becomes a possibility, changing several events in the history of this alternate universe. A virus nicknamed the T4 Angel virus attached itself to a flaw in the genome of a genetically manipulated tomato (its lab identification being T4 Angel tomato), and quickly spread around the world.  As a result of the plague, all biogenetic research, including reverse engineering and genetic splicing, has been outlawed.  Additionally, the human race has developed a cultural fear of tomatoes and tomato-based food products such as pizza sauce and tomato ketchup.

The Turn
The T4 Angel virus killed a quarter of the human population. Upon noticing the combined number of their various species now neared that of humanity, the supernatural species quickly seized the opportunity to make themselves known.  The fact the structure of the civilization remained somewhat intact during "The Turn" is attributed to the fact many of the supernatural beings being in (or seizing) positions of power, including a vampire named Rynn Cormel acting as the president of the USA (but never sworn in).

The supernatural beings are known as "Inderlanders". As laws and societies are dramatically changed by factors relating to these new sentient species, all levels of law enforcement in the United States break down.  Two new organizations, the Inderlander Security service (consisting entirely of non-humans) and the Federal Inderlander Bureau (consisting entirely of normal humans), replace the former law enforcement agencies at all levels. The convention that allows both agencies to operate forbids Inderlanders from being on the F.I.B. payroll, although consulting jobs mostly are allowed.

The Ever-after
The Ever-after is a magical plane that existed outside the ken of normal humans until the Turn.  The main pixy character, Jenks, describes it as "...a drop of time that got knocked out, sitting alone by itself with no past behind it to push it forward and no future to pull it along." Concentrations of Ever-after energy are scattered across the normal plane and are called "ley lines." Ley lines can be felt on the normal plane by magic users and the races that formerly dwelt in the Ever-after, such as the elves and witches.  The only race that currently dwells in the Ever-after is that of the demons, having driven out the elves nearly two thousand years ago. Witches also formerly dwelt in the Ever-after but fled to the mundane plane approximately five thousand years ago.

The Ever-after presented in the novels is referred to as the basis for the 'happily ever after' that often occurs at the end of modern fairy tales; due to mistranslation and omission, the factual "in the Ever-after" (referring to a place) became the figurative "happily ever after" (referring to time).

The Ever-after, once a beautiful land filled with fog and forest, was destroyed by the imbalance of the Elf-Demon war, leaving a desert-like wasteland stinking of burnt amber.

The Elf-Demon War
We learn in Ever After that the war was caused by a break in the alliance between Elves and Demons. The Elves enslaved the Demons, and the Demons, in return tried to trap the Elves in the Ever-after. This led to them being bound there in yet another war, until the Elves migrated to reality.

Supernatural races
The novels use Inderlander to refer to all of the supernatural beings that revealed themselves during the Turn. They are divided into two groups: those that are derived from humans and those that are non-human in origin.

Inderlander (non-human) races
Witches: An Inderlander species and the primary practitioners of magic in reality who are a distinct species from humans, although almost phenotypically indistinguishable, and due to a different number of chromosomal pairs, hybrids with humans are impossible. Witches possess a life expectancy of 160 years and a preferred circadian rhythm in which they arise at noon. They are demographically the largest of the four major Inderlander species, although the least political. Most of the population is unaware that the race of witches is the result of a curse cast on demons by elves; they fled the Ever-After 5,000 years prior to the Turn, abandoning the realm to the demons and elves. Rosewood Syndrome is a consequence of the curse that created the witches which affects certain children who would otherwise be capable of kindling demon magic, and the disease, with only two exceptions resulting from illegal genetic medicine, invariably leads to an early death. Witches of low magic ability, generally due to a lack of education, are called warlocks. Witch and warlock have no gender connotation.
Demons: A highly aggressive race that dwells only in the Ever-After, although capable of traveling through the ley lines to reality, they are incapable of being in reality during the day or being on consecrated ground. They are portrayed as particularly litigious and avaricious. However, the strength of contracts relies almost solely on power and leverage, as demons have no respect for the rule of law. Furthermore, their economy is primarily based on favors and knowledge as currency. Their natural life expectancy is 160 years, but through biological renewal inherent in their magic they are virtually immortal. Their magic is a unique combination of earth magic and ley line magic, giving their curses the strength and permanence of the former and the quickness and adaptability of the latter. In an attempt to rid reality of Elves, past demons created the Ever-After but instead of jailing the Elves, the creation forged a link to it trapping themselves. Less than 500 demons are still alive, though this number is not readily known or revealed till the final book.  The only known female demon alive is Newt, who is incredibly powerful and feared but suffers from insanity. Attempts of other demons to reproduce with Newt have been unsuccessful.  In "Ever After" the demons' original appearance is described as slight, dark as midnight, with bat-like wings and cat-like features.
Surface Demons: These creatures are not truly demons, but are thought to be since they live on the surface in the Ever After and are dangerous. It is eventually revealed that these are actually the souls of the undead vampires. After a vampires first death, their soul leaves them and joins the other so-called surface demons in the Ever After.
Elves: A race that migrated from the ever-after nearly 2,000 years ago after engaging in several wars with the demons. The life expectancy of a full-blooded elf is given to be similar to a witch. However, few such elves remain as the elves, trying to preserve and restore their heritage, closely mingled and interbred with humans, which led to a massive die-off during the Turn as they fell susceptible to the Angel virus. They are widely believed to be extinct for most of the series, though there are around several ten thousand purebred Elves alive. Due to the demons magically manipulating and corrupting their DNA, elves have only been able to produce magically stunted children or children that die as toddlers, which is cured around mid series. They practice a unique form of magic often called "wild magic" as it is less easily controllable than witch-magic
Pixies: A small, humanoid race with a lifespan of 18–20 years that lives in gardens and has an intense rivalry with the Fairies due to a competition for resources. They have dragonfly-like wings and stand 4 inches tall. Their culture is traditionally centered around a nuclear family, scattering once a parent dies. They traditionally hibernate during the winter. Pixies have no legal standing, which they sometimes use to their advantage especially where laws are concerned. They rely mostly on the pollen from plants to survive. Pixies are extremely territorial, and will attack fairies or even other pixies who invade their territories. A dash of red indicates peace and allows pixies to travel unharmed through another pixie's territory.  Except we later learn that to the Pixies of the western desert, that wearing too much red can also mean they are looking for a bride.
Fairies: A small race that lives in gardens and has an intense rivalry with the pixies. Their physical appearance includes butterfly-like wings, a height of six inches, and insectoid features. Fairies tend to eat insects and work as mercenaries, if and when, they interact with humans and the larger Inderlanders. Fairies likewise have no legal standing in society, which is also to their preference. They are a migratory species, traveling to Mexico during the winter.  They look like pale grim reapers in their flowing white, almost ragged clothes made from spider silk. All of them without exception have white hair, the men keep it as long as the women. The women have smaller teeth and are somewhat shorter, but otherwise, they look the same.
Leprechauns: A small race (approximately the size of humans with dwarfism) that often grant wishes when captured though they usually offer no more than the minimum of three required by law. They have the ability to fabricate rainbows but are required to pay taxes for any gold at the rainbow's end. It is impossible to steal from a Leprechaun due to their ability to manipulate reality (normally used to grant wishes).
Trolls: A vaguely humanoid race that lives under bridges and can be a public nuisance as they eat the mortar that holds bridges together. Although most trolls cannot speak English, some have learned it. They are known for their sensitive senses and can draw water into themselves to increase their mass. They are willing to work with friendly humanoids.
Banshees: A long-lived female species, they prey upon the emotions of others, using the energy to feed. They hunt all creatures with auras, and as they would normally kill their prey are under many legal restrictions in order to control their hunting. Banshees typically hunt with care, selecting emotionally rich victims and often say harmful things to increase the emotional yield. The amount of emotion required for a banshee to become pregnant coupled with the lack of restraint young banshees have means that their numbers increase very slowly. This is not a major problem as banshees require territories and the reduced population can only support a small number. Once a banshee reaches maturity she no longer ages.
Gargoyles: A species that hunts at night, preying primarily on birds supplemented with iron and other metals. They prefer to live on consecrated ground and will roost there during the day. Leathery and light when active at night. As they age, they acquire the ability to stay awake during sunlight hours. Gargoyles have an intense connection with the ley lines and provide focus and other abilities when aiding witches or held captive by demons. Unbound gargoyles can pass unhampered through all protection circles. Once bound, a gargoyle can only pass through their bond-mate's aura, will live as long as their bond-mate and are sensitive to their bond-mate's actions and well-being. Like the troll, a Gargoyle can draw water into itself for extra mass. They can also manipulate heat.
Dryads: A type of nymph, most of the species had been wiped out in the industrial revolution, though there were some signs that they are coming back in the mountains—now that we weren't cutting down hundred-year-old trees anymore.  We only meet one in the series (so far), a dryad named Daryl, that has a relationship with Ivy and Glenn.
Nymph:  Nymphs are an inderlander species that are identified with natural features such as mountains (oreads), trees and flowers (dryads and meliae), springs, rivers and lakes (naiads) or the sea (nereids).  Though we only here mention of a dryad in the story so far.

Derived from humans

Vampires
Vampires The vampire virus is the result of a demon curse granted to a man (and his descendants) who was afraid to die. ln this series vampires are similar to common portrayals of vampires, with some exceptions. Their saliva contains drugs that make the pain of a vampire's bite feel like pleasure. Vampires can also sensitize their victim's bite so that only that vampire can affect the victim, leaving the victim mentally bound to that vampire. There are two kinds of vampires, living and undead.

Living vampires are normal humans infected with the vampire virus. They are divided into two groups: high- and low-blood. Low-blood vampires are normal humans that have been infected by the bite of an undead vampire, and have only a small amount of the benefits the virus grants, such as increased strength and speed, as well as the craving for blood. When low-blood vampires die, be it of natural causes or otherwise, they simply die like any other humans, unless an undead vampire is there at their moments of death to bring them back as undead by giving its blood. Unlike traditional vampires, low-blood vampires don't have fangs and aren't pale.

High-blood vampires are vampires who were born already infected by the virus, which has influenced their development in the womb. They have increased strength and speed, more so than low-blood vampires, but not as much as the undead; they do however have some abilities that the other kinds don't: living high-blood vampires are empathic and can "pull an aura" to influence, intimidate, or control others. They have sharper and slightly longer canine teeth than humans or low-blood vampires. They also have a greater craving for blood than low-blood vampires, but it is not essential to their existence. When high-blood vampires die, no matter the cause, they rise again as undead the next sundown. Their appearance as undead is more like traditional literary vampires such as Bram Stoker's Dracula, so they then have longer fangs and paler skin.

When vampires become undead, they gain the full physical benefits of the vampire virus, but lose their souls and their ability to keep their aura in the process. They now have the ability to turn humans into vampires and bespell even unwilling hosts. Vampire society is regulated by master vampires, usually in control of the underworld in larger cities. Master vampires have a coterie called a camarilla, to which their followers and families belong, with a complex social hierarchy in which everyone is subordinate to someone else except master vampires, who are the kingpins of the vampire society. Vampires outside of a camarilla often look to become part of one, as a camarilla serves as a support group for the lifestyle demanded by vampires.

As for weaknesses, while low- and high-blood living vampires are immune to sunlight or holy items, they can be killed in any normal way: weapons, diseases, poisons, age, and so on. On the other hand, undead vampires have all the traditional vampire weakness: stakes, sunlight, holy items, silver, fire, and decapitation. However, in the Hollows series there is one original weakness: sharing the blood of another undead vampire will result in death

Weres
Weres are lycanthropes with bestial attributes who are otherwise human in appearance. According to legend, the origin of the Weres lies in a demon's curse upon a group of humans. The demon used a spell to turn into a wolf, then proceeded to have intercourse with them, and werewolves were the result.

The common presentation of Weres in the novels is that of a traditional werewolf although werefoxes have appeared. Reportedly, the main difference between werewolves and werefoxes is werefoxes can control the size they turn, while werewolves' sizes are converted over from their human weight and relative size.  Also, werefoxes are descended from elves rather than humans, which may explain their size-changing ability.

In society, Weres live and operate much as natural wolves do: they form packs with alpha pairs, betas, etc., and there are also loners as well. It is not uncommon for them to date outside their species early in life.

There is no "werewolf curse" as presented in other lycanthrope stories. Instead, Weres must rely upon breeding to increase their numbers, unless under an external influence. In the series, legends tell of a demonic device which allows Weres to turn a human by bite. The story tells that this device, called the "Focus", once used to play a major role in their political structure, revolving around who controlled it. The legend stated that over five thousand years ago, the focus-empowered Weres planned to convert humanity by force.  However, the witches crossed over to reality from the Ever-after around that time; driven by self-preservation, the vampires, humans, and witches banded together to remove the Focus and its influence from the Weres' possession. It was said to have been destroyed, but was only kept in hiding.  The Focus plays a role in the middle books of the series.

Unlike vampires, Weres can enter holy ground but choose not to because of their beliefs.  They are apparently vulnerable to silver.

Ghosts and spirits
The existence of ghosts and spirits is made plain by references to fears by characters. Ghosts are disembodied souls that are in limbo have not "moved on" according to the series mythos. One character is the ghost of a dead witch. He is released from purgatory when his tombstone is cracked. Later he is given corporeal form through a deal with a demon.

Gods and goddesses
Although many claim none exist, religious artifacts have a great deal of power and several characters of note are religious. It is suggested that it was not unusual for Inderlanders to convince humans to worship them. The Trickster Goddess, the Goddess of Wild Magic, is one who appears in the story. Her laughter or her gaze often accompanies Wild Magic. Many wielders often feel that promises of moral behavior to the Goddess allow them skill in wielding wild magic.

Magic 
There are four known branches of magic in the novels, earth magic, ley line magic, demonic magic, and wild magic. All magic draws its power from ley lines, sources of energy that are scattered across the surface of the world. A magic user is labeled as either white or black, depending upon how the magic affects his or her soul. White magic is not damaging to the practitioner's soul, while black magic is. The stain upon the magic user's aura (energy emanated from the soul and that which protects one's soul) depends on how much the magic distorts the natural and causes an imbalance. The stain or smut, named because it appears as a black layer covering the aura, can be fostered off onto another but cannot be destroyed.

Earth magic
Earth magic filters ley line energy through plants and animals and, although slower than ley line magic, is just as powerful. It is associated with living things, potions, amulets, and charms. Spells can sometimes be stored and called upon later. Earth magic can actually alter one's physical appearance or shape. The effects are permanent unless doused in saltwater. Earth magic tends to be associated with white magic users since it is more difficult to gain access to the materials necessary for black earth magic. Black earth magic involves the sacrifice of animals and, in some cases, humans or Inderlanders.

Ley line magic
Ley line magic has less permanence than earth magic, but is much faster and more easily adaptable. Power can be drawn directly from a ley line or through an animal familiar. The energy is either channeled using a focus object or what is referred to as "raw magic" in which the power is imprecisely directed by the magic user that drew on the line. Ley line magic can only alter perception and not physical form like earth magic.

Demonic magic
Demonic magic combines ley line magic and earth magic to create something very fast, very powerful, and everlasting. As its name implies, demonic magic is practiced almost entirely by demons. Demons also use familiars, but instead of animals, they use sentient species such as witches, elves, and humans. This type of magic is extremely powerful and can be used to change one's species and cause huge amounts of damage. For example, a demonic curse can allow a being to "Were" (change into an animal), retain cognition of the original being, yet continue its life as the animal who can even have offspring. Because of the perversion of the laws of physics that demon magic embodies, the cost of this type of magic is extremely high, so much so that demons try to foster off the cost onto their familiars or other willing parties. Witches with the gene to wield demonic magic were cursed long ago by the elves so that any witch with the genetic mutation usually dies before his or her first birthday from Rosewood Syndrome.  Only two witches have been seen to practice demon magic: Stanley Saladan and Rachel Morgan.  It is later revealed that Rachel Morgan and Stanley Saladan, while the children of witches, are genetic demons.

Wild magic
Wild magic, also known as Elven or Celtic magic, incorporates a religious system grounded in nature and practised by Elves. Wild magic is powerful but unpredictable, almost alive at times. It will do the task it is meant to do, but the how is unpredictable and dependent upon the Trickster Goddess. Wild magic uses singing when cast, often accompanied by the Goddess's laughter.

References

Alternate history book series
Contemporary fantasy novels
Fantasy novel series
Science fiction book series
American detective novels
Novels set in Cincinnati
American mystery novels

de:Kim Harrison#Rachel Morgan Serie / The Hollows